Luther is a town in Oklahoma County, Oklahoma, United States, and a part of the Oklahoma City Metropolitan Area. The population was 1,221 at the 2010 census. Sperling Best Places lists the population of 4073 for the 73054 Luther zip code, which includes the town and immediate surrounding area of rural residents.

Geography
Luther is located at  (35.660659, -97.191521).

Luther is located in the Cross Timbers ecoregion and the Frontier Country tourism region.

Demographics

As of the census of 2010, the total population was 1,221, with 445 households, and 329 families living in the town.

This is a sizable increase from 2000, when there were 612 people, 228 households, and 163 families living in the town. There were 266 housing units at an average density of 59.3 per square mile (22.9/km2). The racial makeup of the town was 77.78% White, 11.11% African American, 5.88% Native American, 0.82% from other races, and 4.41% from two or more races. Hispanic or Latino of any race were 1.63% of the population.

There were 228 households, out of which 39.5% had children under the age of 18 living with them, 52.6% were married couples living together, 13.6% had a female householder with no husband present, and 28.5% were non-families. 25.4% of all households were made up of individuals, and 10.1% had someone living alone who was 65 years of age or older. The average household size was 2.68 and the average family size was 3.22.

In the town, the population was spread out, with 32.4% under the age of 18, 8.8% from 18 to 24, 26.5% from 25 to 44, 20.1% from 45 to 64, and 12.3% who were 65 years of age or older. The median age was 35 years. For every 100 females, there were 89.5 males. For every 100 females age 18 and over, there were 86.5 males.

The median income for a household in the town was $31,442, and the median income for a family was $35,625. Males had a median income of $27,083 versus $20,208 for females. The per capita income for the town was $13,934. About 4.4% of families and 5.1% of the population were below the poverty line, including 0.5% of those under age 18 and 8.9% of those age 65 or over.

Transportation
Luther is located northeast of Oklahoma City on Oklahoma State Highway 66, formerly  U.S. 66. Like many towns between Oklahoma City and Tulsa, Luther was bypassed by opening of the Turner Turnpike in 1953. After decades of planning, a new interchange 11 miles (18 km) east of I-35 was opened at Hogback Road south of Luther in 2011, granting more commuter access between Luther and Oklahoma City.

Notable people
George Blackerby, Major League Baseball player
Jake Dunn, Negro league baseball player

References

External links
Town of Luther official website

Oklahoma City metropolitan area
Towns in Oklahoma County, Oklahoma
Towns in Oklahoma